Wojsko komputowe (comput army) is a type of military unit that was used in the Polish–Lithuanian Commonwealth in the 17th century and the 18th century.

Until the mid-17th century, Polish forces were divided into permanent units and supplemental units ( or ), which were created in the time of military needs. In 1652 this distinction ceased, and both types of forces were merged into wojsko komputowe.

Wojsko kwarciane was composed from various units, both Commonwealth-born soldiers and foreign mercenaries. The Diet voted to pay for certain amount of infantry and cavalry.

Personnel number (which was a kept a state secret) varies, because often the commanders (hetmans) paid for additional manpower themselves. During peacetime, the Commonwealth komput army numbered about 12,000 for the Crown (Poland proper) and 6,000 for the Grand Duchy of Lithuania. During wartime it was increased to around 24,000–40,000 for the Crown and 8,000-22,000 for Lithuania.

In addition, wojsko kwarciane was supplemented with peasant-based recruits of piechota wybraniecka and from 1653, piechota łanowa, registered Cossacks (until 1699), pospolite ruszenie, royal guard, armies of magnates and cities, and wojsko ordynackie.

Military history of the Polish–Lithuanian Commonwealth